Silvestro is both a surname and a masculine Italian given name. Notable people with the name include:

Surname:
Alex Silvestro (born 1988), American football player
Chris Silvestro (born 1979), Scottish footballer
Jim Silvestro (born 1963), Australian rules footballer
 Milo Silvestro, Italian musician, and lead singer of American heavy metal band Fear Factory
René De Silvestro (born 1996), Italian para alpine skier 

Given name:
Silvestro Aldobrandini (1500–1558), Italian lawyer
Silvestro de Buoni (died 1484), Italian Renaissance painter
Silvestro Chiesa (died 1657), Italian Baroque painter
Silvestro Durante (died 1672), Italian Baroque composer
Silvestro Ganassi dal Fontego (born 1492), Italian musician
Silvestro de' Gigli (died 1521), Italian Roman Catholic bishop
Silvestro Lega (1826–1895), Italian painter
Sylvestro "Pedro" Morales (18??–1???), Mexican bandit
Silvestro Palma (1754–1834), Italian composer
Silvestro Valiero (1630–1700), Doge of Venice

Italian masculine given names